The Royal Rifles of Canada was a rifle regiment in the Canadian Army and fought alongside The Winnipeg Grenadiers in the Battle of Hong Kong during World War II. In November 1966, it was reduced to nil strength and placed on the Supplementary Order of Battle.

Lineage

The Royal Rifles of Canada 
The Royal Rifles of Canada originated in Quebec City, Canada East, on 28 February 1862, when The 8th Battalion Volunteer Militia Rifles, Canada was authorized. It was redesignated the 8th or Stadacona Volunteer Militia Rifles on 28 March 1862; the 8th Battalion "Royal Rifles" on 6 April 1877; the 8th Regiment "Royal Rifles" on 8 May 1900; The Royal Rifles of Canada on 29 March 1920; the 2nd (Reserve) Battalion, The Royal Rifles of Canada on 7 November 1940 and The Royal Rifles of Canada on 1 June 1945. On 22 February 1965, it was amalgamated with Les Voltigeurs de Québec. On 1 November 1966, these two regiments ceased to be amalgamated and the regiment was reduced to nil strength and transferred to the Supplementary Order of Battle.

The Sherbrooke Hussars, a present-day Canadian Army Primary Reserve armoured regiment, has the honorary distinction of placing the Royal Rifles' badge and the date 1941 on its guidon.  This distinction is not a battle honour, but an acknowledgement that one of its predecessor units, the 7th/XIth Hussars, provided about half its effective strength to the Royal Rifles while it was preparing for overseas.

Lineage Chart 

|- 
|style="text-align: left;"|
 class="wikitable"
+ Abbreviations used in the chart
-
! Abbreviation !! Phrase
-
 Bn  Battalion
-
 CASF   Canadian Active Service Force
-
 CEF   Canadian Expeditionary Force
-
 Coys   Companies
-
 Infy   Infantry
-
 Regt   Regiment

|- 
|style="text-align: left;"|Notes:

Perpetuations

The Royal Rifles of Canada perpetuate the 12th Battalion, CEF and the 171st Battalion (Quebec Rifles), CEF.

Operational history

The Fenian Raids

The 8th Volunteer Militia Rifles were called out on active service on 8 March 1866 in response to the Fenian raids. The battalion, which served in Quebec City, was removed from active service on 31 March 1866.

South African War

The regiment contributed volunteers for the Canadian contingents in the field, mainly the 2nd (Special Service) Battalion, Royal Canadian Regiment of Infantry.

The Great War
Details of the regiment were placed on active service on 6 August 1914 for local protection duties.

The 12th Battalion, CEF was authorized on 10 August 1914 and embarked for Great Britain on 30 September 1914. It was redesignated as the 12th Reserve Infantry Battalion, CEF on 29 April 1915, to provide reinforcements for the Canadian Corps. The battalion was disbanded on 15 September 1920.

The 171st Battalion (Quebec Rifles), CEF was authorized on 15 July 1916 and embarked for Great Britain on 24 November 1916. Its personnel were absorbed by the 20th Reserve Battalion, CEF on 8 January 1917 to provide reinforcements to the Canadian Corps. The battalion was disbanded on 27 July 1917.

The Second World War
Details from the regiment were called out on service on 26 August 1939 and then placed on active service on 1 September 1939, as The Royal Rifles of Canada, Canadian Active Service Force (Details), for local protection duties. The details called out on active service were disbanded on 31 December 1940. Details of the regiment were again called out on service on 1 January 1941, under the designation Details of 2nd (Reserve) Battalion, The Royal Rifles of Canada. The details were removed from active service on 30 September 1941.

The regiment subsequently mobilized The Royal Rifles of Canada, CASF for active service on 24 May 1940. It was redesignated as the 1st Battalion, The Royal Rifles of Canada, CASF on 7 November 1940. The battalion served in Newfoundland on garrison duty from early November 1940 to August 1941. On 27 October 1941 it embarked for Hong Kong as a part of C Force, where it was destroyed while fighting in defence of the colony. The unit was reconstituted on 10 January 1942. It served in Canada in a home defence role as part of the Vancouver Defences of Pacific Command. On 2 January 1945 it embarked for Great Britain, where it was disbanded on 10 January 1945 to provide reinforcements to the Canadian army in the field.

Battle Honours
Those battle honours in bold type are emblazoned on the regimental accoutrements.

The 7th/11th Hussars contributed about 400 officers and men to the Royal Rifles in 1940 for their operation in Hong Kong. The Sherbrooke Hussars, who incorporate the 7th/11th Hussars, bear the honorary distinction of the badge of the Royal Rifles of Canada, with the year-date 1941, on their guidon.

Notable Members 

 Major-General Sir David Watson 
 Chaplain Frederick George Scott 
 Gander, Newfoundland (dog) canine mascot of the regiment and hero who carried away a hand grenade from wounded members of the unit and later posthumously awarded the Dickin Medal

See also
 Hong Kong Veterans of Canada Association

References
 Royal Rifles of Canada heritage lost in Armoury fire

Books
Hong Kong Veterans' Association of Canada. Quebec-Maritimes Branch "The Royal Rifles of Canada in Hong Kong, 1941-1945" (Canada: The Association, ©1980)

Rifle regiments of Canada
Military units and formations of Quebec
Infantry regiments of Canada in World War II
Military units and formations established in 1862
1862 establishments in Canada
Military units and formations disestablished in 1966
Battle of Hong Kong
Supplementary Order of Battle